Yulayevo (Yulay) is a rural locality (a village) in Alkinsky Selsoviet, Salavatsky District, Bashkortostan, Russia. The population was 123 as of 2010. There are 5 streets.

Geography 
Yulayevo is located 20 km southwest of Maloyaz (the district's administrative centre) by road. Muratovka is the nearest rural locality.

References 

Rural localities in Salavatsky District